The Stuttgart Stadtbahn is a light rail system in Stuttgart, Germany. The Stadtbahn began service on 28 September 1985. It is operated by the Stuttgarter Straßenbahnen AG (SSB), which also operates the bus systems in that city. The Stuttgart Stadtbahn is successor system of a tram network (Straßenbahnen) that characterized the urban traffic in Stuttgart for decades.

The network of the Stadtbahn covers much of Stuttgart and also reaches the neighbouring towns of Remseck am Neckar, Fellbach, Ostfildern, Leinfelden-Echterdingen and Gerlingen (clockwise). In 2014, the Stuttgart Stadtbahn carried 174.9 million passengers.

Lines
, the Stuttgart Stadtbahn system is made up of fourteen main lines (U1-U9, U12-U15 and U19),
two special lines (during the construction site between Hauptbahnhof and Staatsgalerie; U29 and U34) and a special event lines (U11):

History

In 1961 the city council of Stuttgart decided that a general modernization of the municipal tram system was needed; in central areas, tram track would be relocated underground, and in peripheral areas it would get new tracks that would be separate from road traffic. Concurrent proposals for a new completely underground subway (U-Bahn) were rejected in 1976. At the same time, it was decided to modernize the existing tram infrastructure and change from metre gauge to the standard gauge. For this reason, almost all tracks have been converted to mixed-gauge, on which old trams (SSB GT4, built 1959–1965) could run as well as new metro cars (SSB DT 8, in regular service since 1985).

In 1989, the light rail lines were given new numbers U1, U3 and U14 to distinguish them from the S-Bahn and tram lines. The E-line to Cannstatter Wasen and the stadium was renamed to U11 in 1994.

2011
The SSB has changed the timetable change on December 12, 2010, some light rail lines in their course. The north branches of the lines U5 and U7 were exchanged, so that the U5 now goes to Killesberg and the U7 to Mönchfeld. Likewise, the U4 runs - as 25 years ago - from Berliner Platz on the previous route of the U2 to Hölderlinplatz, the U2 runs instead to Botnang.

The metro line U12 operated until 2013 between Möhringen and Killesberg (in the rush hour: Vaihingen-Killesberg). On the Möhringen-Vaihingen section, it partially replaced the U6, which has been operating from Möhringen since 11 December 2010 to the industrial area Fasanenhof-Ost.

The conversion coupled from the advent equally strong outsiders. Thus, the large residential area Zuffenhausen / Rot / Freiberg / Mönchfeld is now served with double trains and eliminated the previous overstaffing. The U2 now also serves two heavily frequented outsiders who are considering an expansion of capacity. For this purpose, longer trains are used in Stuttgart while maintaining the 10-minute cycle. First, the platforms must be extended, on some routes by extending another line.

2013
With the opening of the new section north of the Löwentorkreuzung to Hallschlag on 14 September 2013, the route network changed. The former section of the U15, from the stop City Library on the Nordbahnhofstraße to the Löwentorkreuzung, is served since then by the U12, which continues from there to continue in the Hallschlag. Since then, the U15 has been operating on the Heilbronner Straße directly to the Pragsattel. The Killesberg is now approached only by the U5.

The 2040 meter long section between the Löwentor and Hallschlag stations was completed in September 2013. The route runs mostly in the middle of the Löwentorstraße, between the directional lanes, on the green strip that has been kept free for many years. Since then, there is only one lane left in each direction. The three intersections Hunklinge, Zurich street and "Auf der Steig" were converted into roundabouts. As early as during the construction of the Pragsattel tunnel, the tracks were laid in the area of the Löwentork junction.

The four stops Löwentor, Zurich Street, Riethmüllerhaus and Hallschlag have been added for the U12. They are equipped with long elevated platforms. Around 200 trees were felled for the construction of the route. Eight larger specimens could be preserved and transplanted. Young trees are replanted on both sides of the carriageway so that an avenue is created on large parts of the Löwentorstraße.

2016 to 2018
The lines planned in the context of Stuttgart 21 require a new construction of the city railway station Staatsgalerie and the tunnel between Staatsgalerie and Hauptbahnhof and / or Charlottenplatz. During the construction period the section Staatsgalerie - Charlottenplatz was closed from May 2016 until December 2017. Since December 2017, the section Staatsgalerie - Hauptbahnhof is closed until at least December 2022. The affected lines U1, U2, U4, U9, U11 and U14 are diverted during these periods and partially split into two lines. Originally it had been planned to carry out the new construction of the station Staatsgalerie and the tunnel in the ongoing Stadtbahn. Alliance 90 / The Greens criticized the SSB and the Federal Railway Authority on the basis of the concept presented. They called for more public participation and accused the SSB of not mentioning the planned closures in its statement on the plan amendment.

The SSB designates the associated line concepts as network 2016 or network 2018 and divides them as follows:

In addition to the changeover in the city center, the network Wallgraben - Dürrlewang was put into operation in 2016, as well as the line 2018, Hauptbahnhof - Budapester Platz - Milchhof and Hallschlag - Bottroper Straße - Wagrainäcker U12. The light rail line U12 operates since 2017 with double trains from Dürrlewang in the south coming over the city center, through the Europaviertel, the Nordbahnhofviertel and the Hallschlag down to the Neckar valley to Remseck in the north. For the U14 does not drive since then to Remseck, but only to Mühlhausen. The extension of the south branch between Dürrlewang and moat was already on 13 May 2016 in operation.

First, the U14 should in return already end at Max-Eyth-See, March 19, 2013, it was decided that it runs up to Mühlhausen. For this purpose, a Kehrgleis with a 40-meter-long platform was set up at this stop.

The sections added in 2016 and 2017 are primarily intended to better connect the previously neglected district of Hallschlag, the European district under construction, the planned Rosenstein district and further planned new development areas on the existing track systems within the framework of Stuttgart 21. The entire route is designed for 80-meter trains.

The light rail tunnel between the stops Hauptbahnhof (Arnulf-Klett-Platz) and Stadtbibliothek was rebuilt due to Stuttgart 21 in a different location. The U12 uses this new tunnel until shortly before the stop Stadtbibliothek and then threads underground in the direction of Budapester Platz. In the Europaviertel section of the U12 runs as far as possible in the tunnel and reaches after undercutting the city library on Milan's east side with a ramp the surface, where after crossing the Lisbon street on a bridge the stop Budapester place follows. Afterwards, the 145 meter long bridge route crosses Wolframstraße / Nordbahnhofstraße and in a lateral position south of Nordbahnhofstraße to the intersection Friedhofstraße / Nordbahnhofstraße. There it connects to the ground-level Stadtbahn tracks in central location of Nordbahnhofstraße.

In the past, with the opening of this section, it was planned to also run the U15 line on this route. After the beginning of 2008 by the SSB initiated amendment of the plan approval decision, the route runs in Nordbahnhofstraße, as described, above ground in sideways position and pivots about level Friedhofstraße in the middle layer and connects to the stop Milchhof. Originally an underpass of the junction Nordbahnhof- / Rosensteinstraße was planned. Reason for the change in planning were too high estimated traffic forecasts, of up to 18,000 cars per day for the Rosensteinstraße, as well as concerns on the political level against a premature termination of the existing branch in the Friedhofstraße. With the commissioning of the new construction section, the section in Friedhofstraße and the existing station Pragfriedhof were closed at the end of 2017. In order to be able to offer nostalgic tram traffic with the former meter-gauge tramcars in the future, the new line is designed as a three-rail track through the Europaviertel.

In another section, the U12 connects in the north to the route of the U14. The route runs from the stop Hallschlag in a trough south of the Löwentorstraße and reaches the new stop Bottroper street. This is followed by a 500-meter-long tunnel, which leads to the Neckar valley and passes under the Schusterbahn cable car. After that, the road is crossed with a new bridge to be built, and at the Neckar bridge, it joins the route of the U14. This section is about 1.1 km long. The next stop is the Wagrainäcker.

Current light rail system
(The Stuttgart rail system also encompasses a rack railway (Line 10), a funicular (Line 20), and a weekend heritage tram line (Line 21).) In the city centre as well as in other densely built-up districts of the city, the Stadtbahn runs underground. The Stadtbahn uses the "U" logo like the underground systems (U-Bahnen) in other German cities. However, here the "U" does not stand for untergrund (underground) but for unabhängig (independent, meaning independent of other traffic infrastructure). Outside the densely built up areas, the Stadtbahn runs on the surface, often along roads with level crossings, though on a separate right-of-way. However some trains, especially U15 line's trains, operate partially with street running and share space with other traffic.

Light rail vehicles

The system is operated with 224 light rail vehicles, operates on standard gauge track, and is electrified at 750 volts DC. The latest vehicles are 60 Tango trains from Stadler Rail. On 8 December 2007 the ongoing replacement of the city's tram lines was finally completed after 27 years.

Color
Since the coat of arms of Stuttgart shows a black, rampant horse on a yellow or golden field, the Stuttgart Stadtbahn (as well as all the buses and the last old trams) comes in yellow with black or dark blue window frames.

Hours of operation
The Stuttgart Stadtbahn operates from 04:00 - 01:00.
 Monday-Friday: Service frequency is every 10 minutes between 06:00 - 07:00 and 20:00 - 20:30.
 Saturday: Service frequency is every 10 minutes between 09:30 - 10:30 and 20:00 - 20:30.
 Sunday: Service frequency is every 10 minutes between 10:30 - 11:30 and 17:30 - 18:00.
 On all days: Prior to the 10 minute frequency service times the service interval is every 15–30 minutes and after the 10 minute frequency service times the service interval is every 15 minutes.
 Exceptions are the U5 line which operates every 20 minutes during the day and evening (and every 30 minutes at other times) and the U8 line which only operates Monday-Friday from 6:00 to 19:00 with a service frequency of every 20 minutes.
Most routes are served by two or more lines in the city centre, so there is a train every few minutes at most stations.

Fares and ticketing
The Stadtbahn is part of the regional transport cooperative, the Verkehrs- und Tarifverbund Stuttgart (VVS; Stuttgart Transit and Tariff Association), which coordinates tickets and fares among all transport operators in the metropolitan area. Besides the Stadtbahn, these include the SSB's bus networks, together with the Stuttgart S-Bahn, operated by a subsidiary of Deutsche Bahn AG (DBAG), and DBAG's Regionalbahn regional train services within the VVS area.

Latest Extensions

Relocation of Staatsgalerie stop (follow-up due to Stuttgart 21)
The Staatsgalerie stop has had to be raised and moved to the Schlossgarten in order to create space for the eastern access to the underground station planned as part of the Stuttgart 21 project. This measure includes reimbursement of costs for possible malfunctions funded by funds from the project. Construction work for the new route has started; from December 10, 2017, the section between Staatsgalerie and Hauptbahnhof was closed to Stadtbahn trains. The corresponding lines were diverted via Charlottenplatz. The newly rebuilt stop opened to passengers in September 2021

Rosenstein Tunnel
Due to the construction of the Rosenstein tunnel for the B10, the Wilhelma station was rebuilt in a different location, directly in front of the main entrance to the Wilhelma. Likewise, the Rosensteinpark station is to be rebuilt. As of January 2018, the old platform has already been demolished and replaced by two temporary platforms. Due to the construction pits, the route between Rosensteinpark and Glockenstraße and between Wilhelma and Mineralbäder or Mercedesstraße ran in a single track.

U6-Süd: Fasanenhof Schelmenwasen – Flughafen/Messe Ost
The U6 has been extended by three kilometers from the Fasanenhof Ost commercial area to the Messe Stuttgart and the airport. Commissioning was scheduled for mid-2021 and realized in December 2021. After crossing the A8, the route runs east along the B 27 with stops at Echterdingen Stadionstraße and Messe West, and then north of the airport road to the final stop, Flughafen/Messe Ost, in the immediate vicinity of the existing S-Bahn station and planned Filderbahnhof. The initial cost estimate was €70 million, but was revised to €94 million in 2016, and €101.3 million in 2017.

On 14 November 2012, the state of Baden-Württemberg decided to promote the U6. The state assumes 20% of the eligible costs, and the federal government 60%. In the cost-benefit analysis, the U6 extension performed better than a fair connection with the U5 from Leinfelden. Therefore, the U6 extension was pursued, although both routes would be economical.

In late summer 2013, there was agreement on the financing of the negotiators of the cities of Stuttgart and Leinfelden-Echterdingen, the state, the SSB and the district of Esslingen. In September 2013, the regional assembly approved the agreements and thus decided to build the U5 (see article below), the U6 and the S2. Work on clearing the construction site started in October 2017.

Possible projects
After completing the U6 extension to the airport, no further network extensions are planned, although there are a number of considerations for improving the offerings on the existing infrastructure as well as further infrastructure upgrades.

Capacity increase on the U1
The platforms on the section between Fellbach and Heslach Vogelrain are to be extended in order to use there double tractions with 80 meters train length. This should increase the capacity on the U1 line. The demand on the section Heslach Vogelrain-Vaihingen is lower, so this part is then to be used with 40-meter trains of the U14. Only the aboveground stops have to be rebuilt, as the platforms of the tunnel stations were already designed for 120 meter long trains.

The platform extension was originally scheduled to be completed in 2016, but was deferred due to lack of funding. Instead, the required capacity should first be created through the U16 amplifier line (Fellbach - Bad Cannstatt - Feuerbach - Giebel). In 2018 plans are to be resumed. Completion is scheduled for 2023.

U19 extension to Mercedes-Benz
There are plans to extend the U19 line from the Neckarpark / Stadion terminus by about 800 meters to the factory gate of Mercedes-Benz. This is intended to make the journey to many employees more attractive by public transport. The Mercedes-Benz world will also be better developed. Even though the mayor of Stuttgart, Fritz Kuhn, is open-minded about the project, according to the SSB a realization before 2021 is hardly possible, since the planning is complex and the planners of the SSB are already busy with the other projects. In view of the particulate matter problem with the impending ban on driving a car, this project received high priority in 2016.

U5-Süd: Leinfelden Markomannenstraße – Echterdingen Hinterhof (– Flughafen/Messe / Filderstadt)
The intention is to rebuild the route between the planned new terminus Markomannenstraße via Echterdingen Gymnasium to the final stop Echterdingen Hinterhof. The line was decommissioned and demolished in 1990, but its route was kept clear. An older investigation confirms the reconstruction of a positive cost-benefit factor. At the request of the municipal council of Leinfelden-Echterdingen, the SSB will consider this extension in the further development of the light rail network.

Next, a possibly subterranean continuation to the outskirts, from there on the surface further to the planned commercial area Echterdingen East and from there to the airport / fair and / or direction Filderstadt possible. If the said business park is created, it will be developed by the U6 (see article U6-renewal above) according to the decisions of the regional assembly, which is why an extension of the U5 beyond Echterdingen backyard seems unlikely.

Light rail connection Pattonville
In addition, the community district of Pattonville brought the cities of Ludwigsburg, Kornwestheim and Remseck am Neckar in the discussion of the U14, by proposing the U12, and the U14 from the Neckar valley in the future in Pattonville end. A study commissioned by the Zweckverband Sonnenberg / Pattonville came to the conclusion that a Stadtbahnverlängerung only up to Pattonville with a benefit cost factor of only 0.5 to 0.6 would be very uneconomic and thus has no chance of realization. However, the alternative route as part of the light rail to Ludwigsburg (see below) achieved an economic value of 1.15.

Stadtbahn Markgröningen - Möglingen - Ludwigsburg - Pattonville
This urban railway line, which runs from Markgröningen via the existing, no longer operated railway line of the Deutsche Bahn to Ludwigsburg and from there through the urban area of Ludwigsburg to Pattonville, is being planned. The project is eligible, as the benefit-cost factor is 1.3. [39] With its 19 stops this would be a major extension of the light rail network and the first, which would be completely outside the city limits of Stuttgart. About the light rail connection Pattonville (see above), the route would be directly connected to the existing light rail network.

Further development Rosensteinviertel
The after completion of Stuttgart 21 to be built Rosensteinviertel should be developed according to the framework plan Stuttgart 21 if necessary with the light rail. A Stadtbahntrasse should then run in the axis Mittnachtstraße, the Rosenstein Park gently cross and connect to the existing Stadtbahntrasse in Stuttgart East. At the new station Stuttgart Mittnachtstraße a transfer point to the discharge of the main station is to be created.

Connection Nellingen - Esslingen
The U7 and U8 currently end in Nellingen at the stop Nellingen-Ostfildern. Until the end of the 1970s, there was an overland tram, which connected Nellingen Zollberg with Esslingen, the tram Esslingen-Nellingen-Denkendorf. A reconstruction of the route from Nellingen to Esslingen with connection of the Esslinger district Zollberg and the Festo headquarters in Berkheim with connection to the S-Bahn line S1 in the Neckar valley was discussed.

Extension of the U2 / U19 to Fellbach-Schmiden
An extension of the U2 or U19 over Neugereut out into the Fellbacher districts Schmiden and Oeffingen is desired by the SSB. An investigation of the possible alignment has already been carried out. By the commissioning of the U19 and the associated relief of the much sought after section Neugereut to Wilhelmsplatz, this extension seems feasible, but an implementation is currently (as of 2016) is not yet foreseeable.

Unused Tunnels
The Herderplatz stop is already set up on a lower lying, today unused tunnel trough, which merges into the existing tunnel to Botnang and to which a possible future tunnel under the Bebelstraße can be connected. At the Herderplatz, two lift shafts were already built in 1994; However, the one on the city-facing platform is still only in the shell state. *This side of the bus stop can still be reached barrier-free via a long ramp. Whether the second elevator is installed, is therefore not foreseeable.
The terminus Ostfildern-Nellingen was laid out in a deep concrete trough, which can be converted into a tunnel ramp during a possible further construction towards Esslingen.
Between the Charlottenplatz and Staatsgalerie stops, the extension of the tunnel, which runs parallel to the south and is currently unused, can be seen, leading to the former provisional tunnel ramp Konrad-Adenauer-Straße (abandoned in 1972 with the opening of the Charlottenplatz-Stöckach section of the tunnel).
As early as the 1980s, a tunnel box was built under the B 10 / B 27 in Zuffenhausen as a preliminary construction allowance for the eventual guidance of the present-day U15 line via Zuffenhausen station. This tunnel is still unused. It extends only under the surface of the federal highway, not under the railway systems of the German course, since these were reduced during the construction of the federal highway, but not rebuilt. As part of the construction of the U15, this tunnel was not used, because it has opted for a leadership of the light rail line through Zuffenhausen. In the future, it is expected that the tunnel will be removed by lowering the B 10 / B 27.
On the section from Vaihingen to Möhringen, an additional standard-gauge turnout was installed in the track to Möhringen during the construction of the new bridge over the north-south road at the beginning of the 1980s. In a then planned relocation of the track construction Wangen to the present Stadtbahnbetriebshof Möhringen (now no longer pursued) would be on this turnout a freight siding from Vaihingen station, which would have shared in parts such as the former Filderbahn the Stadtbahn route along the north-south street connected to the new railway construction yard.
As part of the S-Bahn construction until 1978, a short tunnel section was built in the second basement below the Rotebühlplatz as a construction advance for the light rail. This tunnel went into operation in 1983 after the construction of the underground station Rotebühlplatz and the ramp in the Fritz-Elsas-Straße.
At the section lying today between Leinfelden and Echterdingen in the area Echterdingen high school already in the late 1970s, when the future of this route was not yet decided finally, laid thresholds for a three-rail track (albeit in outer layer). Together with the remaining railway tracks also this already developed section was rebuilt in 1991, since the U5 had received its end point in Leinfelden in 1990 and a continuation was not foreseeable.
At the opening of the inner city tunnel of the Talquerlinie in 1976 and 1978, this was already equipped with standard gauge sleepers between Schlossplatz and the main station and already equipped with elevated platform approaches at the staircases of the stops. At that time, however, it was still from an outer layer of the third rail, which is why the thresholds had to be reversed in the mid-1980s in several night actions on the usual today inner layer. As a result, the edges of the Hochbahnsteigstümpfe at the south end of the station main station were too far from the track, so they in the 2010 made through the Hochbahnsteigs, d. H. Task of the Tiefbahnsteigs, for the light rail operation were not usable. SSB therefore had to adjust the track situation in this area in the summer of 2010.
Under the Small Palace Square was a tunnel of the tram line 8 from 1968 to 1978. In anticipation of future use by the light rail, he was considered a construction advance. In 2002, as part of the new construction of the Kunstmuseum, it was integrated into the exhibition rooms on the lower floors.
In connection with the construction of the municipal library on Milan Square, two 60 m (out of town) and 40 m (city-in) long single-track tunnel tube sections for the U12 route through the Europaviertel were built on the site of the former freight station from November 2008 to the beginning of 2010. These tunnels were connected in 2017 to the newly built tunnel tubes of the Talquerlinien between the city library and the central station and put into operation on December 9, 2017.

See also

 Stuttgarter Straßenbahnen AG
 Stuttgart Rack Railway
 Standseilbahn Stuttgart
 Verkehrs- und Tarifverbund Stuttgart (Stuttgart Transit and Tariff Association)

References

External links

 Stuttgarter Straßenbahnen AG (SSB) - official website 
 Stadtbahn map (pdf)
 Website of the Verkehrs- und Tarifverbund Stuttgart 
 Stuttgart Stadtbahn (UrbanRail.Net) 

Transport in Stuttgart
Light rail in Germany
Underground rapid transit in Germany
Tram transport in Germany
750 V DC railway electrification